The Coopracambra National Park is a national park located in the Gippsland region of Victoria, Australia.

Features
The northern boundary of the park is defined by the Black-Allan Line that marks part of the border between Victoria and New South Wales. The Monaro Highway defines the park's western boundary. Within the confines of the park, the Genoa River flows eastwards to the Tasman Sea.

Combined with the adjoining South East Forests National Park located in New South Wales, the Coopracambra National Park forms one of the largest contiguous areas of high quality wilderness in

See also

 Protected areas of Victoria (Australia)

References

External links

National parks of Victoria (Australia)
Protected areas established in 1988
1988 establishments in Australia
Gippsland (region)